666 is the second album by Hyde, released on December 3, 2003. The album reached number two on the Oricon Top 200 chart.

Track listing

Personnel
 Hyde – vocals, guitars, arrangement, production
 Anis – [speech] (tracks 3, 7-9)
 Lynne Hodbay – [English] (tracks 1, 2, 4-6, 10)
 Hiroki – bass
 Furuton – drums
 Shinji Takeda – saxophone (tracks: 3)
 K.A.Z – synthesizer, guitar, arrangement, production

References 

2003 albums
Hyde (musician) albums
Japanese-language albums